Dirt Game is an Australian drama television series that screened on the ABC. It starred Joel Edgerton and Freya Stafford. The series contains six 50-minute episodes. It was written by Michael Harvey and produced by David Taft and Michael Harvey. It was directed by Brendan Maher and Grant Brown. It premiered on 19 April 2009 and finished on 25 May 2009.

Cast
 Joel Edgerton as Shane Bevic 
 Freya Stafford as Megan Kerr 
 Gerald Lepkowski as Brian Jardine
 Shane Connor as Max Mees
 Katie Wall as Caz Cohen
 Nicholas Bell as Nigel Hay
 Martin Jacobs as Iain Blair
 Lucy Bell as Tess Jardine 
 Adrian Mulraney as Simon Cato
 George Whaley as Tim Royce
 Don Hany as Dion Pesci

Episodes

See also 
 List of Australian television series
 List of Australian Broadcasting Corporation programs

References

Australian drama television series
Australian Broadcasting Corporation original programming
2009 Australian television series debuts
2009 Australian television series endings